, also known as AAB, is a Japanese broadcast network affiliated with the ANN. Their headquarters are located in Akita Prefecture.

Headquarters
233-209 Kawajiri-machi aza Okobata Akita-city, Akita 010-0941 JAPAN

History
1992 October 1: It was set up as Akita Prefecture's third broadcasting station.
1 October 2006: The first digital terrestrial television broadcasts were started from their Akita main station.

Stations

Analog Stations 
Akita (Main Station) JOXX-TV 31ch
Omagari 41ch
Noshiro 19ch
Takanosu 41ch
Kakunodate 27ch
Yuzawa 59ch
Futatsui 60ch
Odate 59ch
Hanawa 56ch
Tazawako 60ch
Honjo 61ch
Maego 44ch
Ioka 48ch

Digital Stations (ID:5)
Akita (Main Station) JOXX-DTV 29ch
Omagari 33ch
Odate 20ch

Programs
Yajiuma Plus - from 06:00 until 07:30 on weekdays
Super Morning - from 07:30 until 09:55 on weekdays
Wide!Scramble - from 11:30 until 13:05 on weekdays
Super J Channel Akita - from 17:00 until 19:00 on weekdays
AAB News and Weather - from 19:54 until 20:00 on weekdays
Goshomaga - from 20:54 until 21:00 on Fridays

Rival stations
Akita Broadcasting System (ABS)
Akita Television (AKT)

Other links
Akita Asahi Broadcasting

Akita Northern Happinets
Akita Prefecture
All-Nippon News Network
Asahi Shimbun Company
Companies based in Akita Prefecture
Television stations in Japan
Japanese-language television stations
Television channels and stations established in 1992
Mass media in Akita (city)
1992 establishments in Japan